Xanthophyllum borneense is a tree in the family Polygalaceae. It is named for Borneo.

Description
The bark is grey-green and smooth. The flowers are pale brownish, drying orange.

Distribution and habitat
Xanthophyllum borneense is endemic to Borneo. Its habitat is riverine forests and on hills, from sea-level to  altitude.

References

borneense
Endemic flora of Borneo
Trees of Borneo
Plants described in 1864
Taxa named by Friedrich Anton Wilhelm Miquel